Chinese Taipei  competed at the 2016 Summer Paralympics in Rio de Janeiro, Brazil, from 7 to 18 September 2016.

Delegation 
Chinese Taipei sent a team of 13 athletes, 5 men and 8 women, and 4 officials to the 2016 Summer Paralympics.  They competed archery, athletics, judo, powerlifting, table tennis and wheelchair tennis.

Medalists

Disability classifications

Every participant at the Paralympics has their disability grouped into one of five disability categories; amputation, the condition may be congenital or sustained through injury or illness; cerebral palsy; wheelchair athletes, there is often overlap between this and other categories; visual impairment, including blindness; Les autres, any physical disability that does not fall strictly under one of the other categories, for example dwarfism or multiple sclerosis. Each Paralympic sport then has its own classifications, dependent upon the specific physical demands of competition. Events are given a code, made of numbers and letters, describing the type of event and classification of the athletes competing. Some sports, such as athletics, divide athletes by both the category and severity of their disabilities, other sports, for example swimming, group competitors from different categories together, the only separation being based on the severity of the disability.

Events

Archery 

Lee Yun-hsien finished second at the 2016 Final Paralympic Qualifying Tournament held in Nove Mesto, Czech Republic, securing a place in the 2016 Summer Paralympics. Paralympic record holder Tseng Lung-hui, who placed sixth in the tournament, also secured a ticket to the competition. The pair also qualified for the mixed team recurve open event.

|-
|align=left|Tseng Lung-hui
|align=left|Men's individual recurve
|611
|10
| (23)W 6–0
| (7)L 4–6
|colspan="3"| did not advance
|9
|-
|align=left|Lee Yun-hsien
|align=left|Women's individual recurve
|550
|21
| (12)L 5–6
|colspan="4"| did not advance
|17
|-
|align=left|Lee Yun-hsienTseng Lung-hui
|align=left|Mixed team recurve
|1161
|9
| 
| (8)L 2–6
|colspan="3"|did not advance
|9
|}

Athletics 

Track Events

Field Events
Liu Ya-ting, aged 25, competed in the Games for the second time. She set a new Paralympic record at the women's F13 javelin throw event in the 2012 Summer Paralympics.

Cycling 

With one pathway for qualification being one highest ranked NPCs on the UCI Para-Cycling male and female Nations Ranking Lists on 31 December 2014, Chinese Taipei qualified for the 2016 Summer Paralympics in Rio, assuming they continued to meet all other eligibility requirements.

Judo 

Runner-up from the 2012 Summer Paralympics, Lee Kai-lin was qualified to compete in the women's 48 kg weight class by virtue of her IBSF world ranking as of May 2016. She finished fifth in the event.

Powerlifting

Five-time Paralympian and three-time Paralympic medalist, Lin Tzu-hui seeks to defend her title in the women's 79 kg weight class. Lin was entered into the competition by virtue of her world ranking as of April 2016.  
Lin Ya-hsuan will also compete in the Paralympics for the fourth consecutive time. The best outcome out of three attempts counted as the final results. The athlete who placed first in each event was allowed a fourth attempt to break the Paralympic or world record.

Table tennis

Three-time Paralympic medalist Wei Mei-hui is set to attend the competition for the fifth consecutive time. Lin Yen-hung, aged 58, is the oldest athlete among the delegates.

Individual

Team

Wheelchair Tennis

Following the suspension of the Russian Paralympic team, a slot was subsequently redistributed to Lu Chia-yi, marking the first time since 2004 for which Chinese Taipei competed in Wheelchair tennis at the Summer Paralympics.

See also
Chinese Taipei at the 2016 Summer Olympics

References

Nations at the 2016 Summer Paralympics
2016
2016 in Taiwanese sport